The cartography of Jerusalem is the creation, editing, processing and printing of maps of Jerusalem from ancient times until the rise of modern surveying techniques. Almost all extant maps known to scholars from the pre-modern era were prepared by Christian mapmakers for a Christian European audience.

Maps of Jerusalem can be categorised between original factual maps, copied maps and imaginary maps, the latter being based on religious books. The maps were produced in a variety of materials, including parchment, vellum, mosaic, wall paintings and paper. All maps marking milestones in the cartography of Jerusalem are listed here following the cartographic histories of the city, from Titus Tobler and Reinhold Röhricht's studies in the 19th century to those of Hebrew University of Jerusalem academics Rehav Rubin and Milka Levy-Rubin in recent decades. The article lists maps that progressed the cartography of Jerusalem before the rise of modern surveying techniques, showing how mapmaking and surveying improved and helped outsiders to better understand the geography of the city. Imaginary maps of the ancient city and copies of existing maps are excluded.

The Madaba Map discovered in modern-day Jordan is the oldest known map of Jerusalem, in the form of a mosaic in a Greek Orthodox Church. At least 12 maps survive from the Catholic mapmakers of the Crusades; they were drawn on vellum and mostly show the city as a circle. Approximately 500 maps are known between the late-1400s and the mid-1800s; the significant increase in number is due to the advent of the printing press. The first printed map of the city was drawn by Erhard Reuwich and published in 1486 by Bernhard von Breydenbach in his Peregrinatio in Terram Sanctam, based on his pilgrimage of 1483. Few of the mapmakers had travelled to Jerusalem – most of the maps were either copies of others' maps or were imaginary (i.e. based on reading of religious texts) in nature. The first map based on actual field measurements was published in 1818 by the Czech mapmaker Franz Wilhelm Sieber. The first map based on modern surveying techniques was published by Charles Wilson in 1864–65 for the British Ordnance Survey.

Notable maps of Jerusalem

Early religious / pilgrimage maps (6th–7th centuries)

Crusader maps (12th–14th centuries)
The Crusader maps were first catalogued in the late 19th century by Reinhold Röhricht; he catalogued eight maps, which he labelled (1) Brüssel, (2) Copenhagen, (3) Florenz?, (4) Haag, (5) München (6) St. Omer, (7) Paris and (8) Stuttgart. Map (3) was later identified as the Uppsala map, and map (5) is the Arculf map (see section above). Today, at least 12 such maps are known.

A majority of the crusader maps are known as "round maps”, showing the city as a perfect circle, considered to symbolize the “ideal city”. These maps have unique features, but they are all related; it is likely that there was an original prototype from which these maps were derived. Four of the earlier round maps are associated with the Gesta Francorum; it has been suggested that illustrating this text may have been the purpose of the prototype round map. All the round maps are east-facing, like the T and O maps of the world to which they show a number of similarities, have five gates in non-symmetrical locations, and show the actual basic street plan of Jerusalem. The maps show two central roads in the shape of a cross, likely to represent the Roman cardo and decumanus, with an additional street leading to Yehoshafat's Gate and – in most but not all – a fourth street starting at St. Stephen's Gate.

Notable 15th–18th century maps

Notable 19th century maps

See also
 Holyland Model of Jerusalem
 Cartography of Palestine (region)

References

Bibliography

Further reading

External links
 Google Arts & Culture, Maps of the Holy Land and Jerusalem
 Maps of Jerusalem at the National Library of Israel: 1000–1800 1800–1900 1900–

Jerusalem
Jerusalem
Jerusalem
Old maps of Jerusalem